Diego Mendoza (born 30 September 1992) is an Argentine footballer who plays for UD Ibiza on loan from Club Atlético Huracán as a forward.

References

External links

1992 births
Living people
Association football forwards
Argentine footballers
Argentine expatriate footballers
Estudiantes de La Plata footballers
Nueva Chicago footballers
Club Atlético Huracán footballers
Club Atlético Belgrano footballers
UD Ibiza players
Argentine Primera División players
Primera Nacional players
Segunda División B players
Argentine expatriate sportspeople in Spain
Expatriate footballers in Spain